The 107th New York State Legislature, consisting of the New York State Senate and the New York State Assembly, met from January 1 to May 16, 1884, during the second year of Grover Cleveland's governorship, in Albany.

Background
Under the provisions of the New York Constitution of 1846, 32 Senators and 128 assemblymen were elected in single-seat districts; senators for a two-year term, assemblymen for a one-year term. The senatorial districts were made up of entire counties, except New York County (seven districts) and Kings County (three districts). The Assembly districts were made up of entire towns, or city wards, forming a contiguous area, all within the same county.

At this time there were two major political parties: the Democratic Party and the Republican Party. In New York City the Democrats were split into three factions: Tammany Hall, "Irving Hall" and the "County Democrats". The Prohibition Party and the Greenback Party also nominated tickets.

Elections
The New York state election, 1883 was held on November 6. Of the five statewide elective offices up for election, four were carried by the Democrats, and one by a Republican. The approximate party strength at this election was: Democratic 446,000; Republican 430,000; Prohibition 18,000; and Greenback 7,000.

Sessions
The Legislature met for the regular session at the State Capitol in Albany on January 1, 1884; and adjourned on May 16.

Titus Sheard (R) was elected Speaker against Frank Rice (D).

Dennis McCarthy (R) was elected president pro tempore of the State Senate.

State Senate

Districts

Note: There are now 62 counties in the State of New York. The counties which are not mentioned in this list had not yet been established, or sufficiently organized, the area being included in one or more of the abovementioned counties.

Members
The asterisk (*) denotes members of the previous Legislature who continued in office as members of this Legislature. Michael C. Murphy and Timothy J. Campbell changed from the Assembly to the Senate.

Employees
 Clerk: John W. Vrooman
 Sergeant-at-Arms: George A. Goss
 Doorkeeper: David W. Bogert
 Stenographer: Hudson C. Tanner
 Postmaster: A. E. Darrow
 Janitor: A. L. Neidick
 Chaplain: S. V. Leech

State Assembly

Assemblymen
The asterisk (*) denotes members of the previous Legislature who continued as members of this Legislature.

Employees
 Clerk: Charles A. Chickering
 Sergeant-at-Arms: Henry Wheeler
 Doorkeeper: Michael Maher
 First Assistant Doorkeeper: James Robinson
 Second Assistant Doorkeeper: John P. Earl
 Stenographer: Emory P. Close

Notes

Sources
 Civil List and Constitutional History of the Colony and State of New York compiled by Edgar Albert Werner (1884; see pg. 276 for Senate districts; pg. 291 for senators; pg. 298–304 for Assembly districts; and pg. 382 for assemblymen)
 Biographical sketches of the members of the Legislature in The Evening Journal Almanac (1884)
 MR. SHEARD TO BE SPEAKER in NYT on January 1, 1884
 THE LEGISLATURE OF 1884 in NYT on January 2, 1884

107
1884 in New York (state)
1884 U.S. legislative sessions